Rasaleela (2012) is a Malayalam language romantic drama film directed by Majeed Maranchery and starring Darshan and Prathishta in the lead roles. The film is a remake of the 1975 Malayalam film of the same name which was directed by N. Sankaran Nair, starring Kamal Haasan and Jayasudha in the lead roles.

Rasaleela marks the coming together of the next generation of talents—Sanjay Chowdhary (son of composer Salil Chowdhary), Vayalar Sarath Chandra Varma (son of lyricist Vayalar Rama Varma) and Vijay Yesudas (son of singer K. J. Yesudas).

Plot 
Unni Maya (Prathishta), a widow in a big tharavadu, develops a fondness for Devan (Darshan), who has accompanied a godman, who has been called in to get rid of the bad omens that surround the family.

Cast 
 Darshan as Devan
 Prathishta as Unni Maya
 Harikeshan Thampi
 Anoop Chandran
 Kalasala Babu 
 Krishna
 Urmila Unni as Savithriyamma

Soundtrack

References

External links

2010s Malayalam-language films
Remakes of Indian films
Films scored by Sanjoy Chowdhury